Schömberg is a spa town in the north of the Black Forest in Baden-Württemberg.

Geography
Schömberg is located 15 km south of Pforzheim and lies on a plateau between the valley of the Enz with the town of Wildbad to its west and the Nagold valley with the town of Bad Liebenzell to its east.

The municipality of Schömberg includes the communities of Bieselsberg, Schwarzenberg, Langenbrand and Oberlengenhart.

Bieselsberg
There are popular hiking trails in the surrounding fir forests. Bieselsberg has bus connections to Schömberg and Pforzheim.

Schwarzenberg
There is a notable stone circle at its western entrance. Schwarzenberg has bus connections to Schömberg and Pforzheim.

Langenbrand
Attractions include the old village church with its medieval paintings and the eastern choir tower, built during the 11th to 12th century. There are currently plans to install up to 6 200m tall wind turbines located next to the population of Langenbrand.

Oberlengenhardt
In clear weather there are scenic views of the Hohenzollern ("Zollernblick") and past the Stuttgart TV Tower up to a rugged view of the Swabian Alb. There are bus connections to Calw, Pforzheim and Wildbad.

Charlottenhöhe
The Charlottenhöhe is not a district but a former tuberculosis sanatorium, and is situated surrounded by forests. It belongs to the municipality of Schömberg and was established in 1907 as a Volksheilstätte (public sanatorium). It was named after Queen Charlotte of Württemberg.

Politics

Municipal Council
The results of the June 13, 2004 local election are as follows:

History
The earliest known historical reference to Schömberg was in 1170.

Religion
The municipality of Schwarzenberg is home to the Haus des Heils (House of Salvation), an educational institution of the Society of Christian Ecclesia (a member church of the Federal Pentecostal Freechurches).

Culture and attractions
Schömberg is touched by the Black Forest Mittelweg, a scenic long-distance hiking trail from North (Pforzheim) to South (Basel).

References

External links
 Schömberg Municipal Homepage (in German)
 Schömberg Local History and Geography (in German)
 Genealogical Research in the Schömberg Area (in German)

Calw (district)